William Joshua Driver (March 2, 1873 – October 1, 1948) was an American politician and a U.S. Representative from Arkansas.

Biography
Born near Osceola, Arkansas, Driver was the son of John B. and Margaret Ann Bowen Driver and attended the public schools. He studied law at eighteen years of age, in the office of Judge G. W. Thomason; was admitted to the bar in 1894, and commenced practice in Osceola, Arkansas. He married Clara Haynes on June 2, 1897 and they had one child.

Career
Driver won election to the Arkansas House of Representatives in 1896. He served in the 31st Arkansas General Assembly, which was contained only Democratic members (a common occurrence during the Solid South period). Thomas A. Matthews won the seat the following cycle, but resigned. The governor appointed Driver to fill the vacancy for the 32nd Arkansas General Assembly.

He was judge of the second judicial circuit of Arkansas from 1911 to 1918, and a member of the State constitutional convention in 1918. He served as delegate to the Democratic National Convention in 1932.

Driver was elected as a Democrat to the Sixty-seventh and to the eight succeeding Congresses serving from March 4, 1921 to January 3, 1939. An unsuccessful candidate for renomination in 1938, he resumed the practice of law and also engaged in the banking business in Osceola, Arkansas, until his death.

Death
Driver died in Osceola, Mississippi County, Arkansas, on October 1, 1948 (age 75 years, 213 days). He is interred at Violet Cemetery, Osceola, Arkansas.

Notes

References

External links
 

1873 births
1948 deaths
People from Mississippi County, Arkansas
Presbyterians from Arkansas
Democratic Party members of the United States House of Representatives from Arkansas
Democratic Party members of the Arkansas House of Representatives
Arkansas state court judges
Arkansas lawyers